CKY-FM (102.3 MHz) is a Canadian FM radio station broadcasting in Winnipeg, Manitoba.  The station airs a hot adult contemporary format branded as KiSS 102.3. The station is owned by Rogers Sports & Media which also owns sister station CITI-FM. CKY's studios are located in Osborne Village south of Downtown Winnipeg, while its transmitter is located at Duff Roblin Provincial Park near Saint Germain.

History
CKY has been the call sign of three radio stations in Winnipeg. The original CKY was formed in 1923 by the Government of Manitoba and operated by the Manitoba Telephone System. The Provincial Government ran the station and in the station's early years, CKY would turn over its signal to the Canadian National Railway and the station would be identified as CNRW. When the Federal Government took over operations of the CNR Network in the 1930s, CKY continued the relationship and much of CKY's programing originated with the CRBC (which later became the CBC). In June 1948, CKY was purchased by the CBC and was renamed CBW. On the last day of 1949, Lloyd Moffat resurrected the CKY call letters to begin the second incarnation of CKY.

The current CKY-FM was established in 1949 by Moffat Communications as CKY, broadcasting at AM 580. The station featured a Top 40 format for much of its broadcast life, which shifted into an oldies format in the 1980s. In the mid-1990s, the station added nighttime sports programming to its schedule, including Toronto Blue Jays baseball and, to service former Winnipeg Jets fans who wanted to follow the team after its relocation in 1996, Phoenix Coyotes hockey. In 1963, Moffat also established the first CKY-FM, at 92.1 on the FM dial and for a period of time was the most powerful radio station in North America broadcasting at 360,000 watts. In 1978, CKY-FM was re-branded as CITI-FM.

A 1980 article in the Free Press said that both CFRW and CKY wanted to broadcast in AM stereo; CKY chose the failed Kahn-Hazeltine system.

In 1992, Moffat sold its radio division Rogers Communications. In 1994, Rogers applied to the CRTC to switch CKY to FM, due to declining listening to AM stations, which would lead to lower revenues. However, due to the success of CKY's "Don Percy and Friends" morning show, which featured numerous "info chats" from businesses, the station managed to make a considerable profit. As a result, Rogers held off the conversion to FM until 2004.

On January 21, 2004, Rogers moved CKY to 102.3 FM, with an ERP of 70,000 watts. The 580 frequency at first went silent in Winnipeg, although community broadcasters have attempted to revive the station as CJML. The new CKY aired a soft adult contemporary format with the on-air brand name 102.3 Clear FM. This restored the adult contemporary format to Winnipeg after it was lost with the flip of CFWM-FM to adult hits in 2002.

A new logo for CKY was unveiled late June 2011, and the station moved in a more rhythmic direction (like sister CHFM-FM Calgary), but was still reporting as adult contemporary per Mediabase and Nielsen BDS.

On February 13, 2015, the station re-branded as 102.3 KiSS FM, without any change in personnel. The re-branding aligned CKY with other "Kiss"-branded hot AC stations operated by Rogers. The station has since moved to a hot AC format and has slightly rebranded as KiSS 102.3.

In 2020, CKY changed its moniker to "Today's Best Music, The New KiSS 102.3", but kept the same hot AC format. The station began carrying the Roz and Mocha Show from CKIS-FM in Toronto, which also airs on other Rogers-owned "KiSS" stations across Canada.

Former logos

References

External links
KiSS 102.3
 

KY-FM
KY
KY-FM
Radio stations established in 1949
1949 establishments in Manitoba